Cornelis sjunger Taube (English: Cornelis sings Taube) is the fifth studio album by Swedish-Dutch folk singer-songwriter Cornelis Vreeswijk. This album is homage to Evert Taube (1890–1976), author, artist, composer and singer.

Track listing
Music and lyrics by Evert Taube unless otherwise noted

"Den sjuttonde balladen"
"Byssan lull" (Trad./Taube)
"Den glade bagarn i San Remo"
"Dansen på Sunnanö"
"Nudistpolka"
"Skärgårdsfrun"
"Ingrid Dardels polska"
"Vals i Valparaiso"
"Och skulle det så vara" (Gunnar Gahn/Taube)
"Oxdragarsång"
"Cervantes (Gunnar Ekelöf/Taube)
"Fritiof Anderssons paradmarsch"
"Jag är fri, jag har sonat"

References

Cornelis Vreeswijk albums
1969 albums
Swedish-language albums
Tribute albums